Hickory Ridge may refer to several places in the United States:

 Hickory Ridge, Alabama
 Hickory Ridge, Arkansas
 Hickory Ridge, Delaware
 Hickory Ridge, Illinois
 Hickory Ridge, Indiana
 Hickory Ridge, Maryland
 Hickory Ridge, Columbia, Maryland
 Hickory Ridge (Highland, Maryland), a historic slave plantation
 Hickory Ridge, Michigan
 Hickory Ridge, Missouri
 Hickory Ridge, Pennsylvania
 Hickory Ridge, Texas
 Hickory Ridge, Virginia